CCR4-NOT transcription complex subunit 6 like is a protein that in humans is encoded by the CNOT6L gene. It is a paralog of CNOT6 and therefore a potential subunit of the CCR4-Not deadenylase complex.

References

Further reading